(or Filipino poker, also known as chikicha or sikitcha), a variation of big two, is a popular type of "shedding" card game that originates on the islands of the Philippines in Calauag, Quezon Province. The object of the game is to be the first to discard one's hand by playing them to the table. If one cannot be first to play all cards, then the aim is to have as few cards as possible. Cards can be played separately or in certain combinations using poker hand rankings. Games of Pusoy Dos can be played by three or four people.

Rules

Suit order

From lowest to highest, clubs, spades, hearts and diamonds, with the 2 being the highest card and the 3 the lowest.

Card combinations
There are various types of card combinations that can be used in play.

Single card: Cards rank from 2 (the highest) to 3 (the lowest). Between cards of the same rank, the higher suit beats the lower suit. That is, a 5 beats a 5.

Pair: A pair of equally ranked cards. Between pairs of the same rank, the pair with the higher suit wins. That is, a 7-7 beats a 7-7.

Three of a kind: Three equally ranked cards. (This is a variation of game play and may be excluded or included as a valid card combination.)

Five-card hand: Any five-card combination following the poker hand rankings. From highest to lowest, valid poker hands include:
Royal flush (jack to 2 with the same suit)
Straight flush (any straight cards with the same suit)
Four of a kind (4 cards of a kind plus any additional card/a Kicker)
Full House (any three of a kind with any pair.)
Flush (any 5 cards with same suit)
Straight (5 cards in consecutive order)

A combination can only be beaten by a better combination with the same number of cards; a single card can be beaten only by a single card, a pair by a pair, a three of a kind by a three of a kind, and a five-card hand by a five-card hand.

The playable combinations are similar to poker hands, but there are vital differences. Unlike poker, there are no "two pair" combinations, and although a four of a kind needs a fifth card to be complete, a three of a kind cannot be accompanied by extra cards (except for a full house when played as a five-card hand).

Dealing and playing
The dealer shuffles the deck and then deals one card at a time either clockwise or counter-clockwise until each player has 13 cards (52 cards / 4 players = 13 cards per player). In games with three people, either 39 or 51 cards can be dealt (13 or 17 cards per player). In some variations, the deck must be reshuffled if any player is dealt all four twos.

The game begins when the player holding the lowest card, which is the 3 depending upon the suit order being played, plays that card or a valid card combination including that card. The card combination should be placed faced up in the center of the table. Play then proceeds clockwise or counterclockwise. The next person must play a higher combination of the same number of cards or pass (play no cards). Once a player passes, they cannot return until a new round has started. If all players pass, the person who last put down a card combination starts a new round by playing any card or valid card combination.

All players are entitled to know the number of cards each player has in hand at any time, and you must answer truthfully if asked.

Winning and scoring
The first person to get rid of all his/her cards wins, and game play stops at this point. If you cannot be first to play all your cards, then your aim is to have as few cards as possible at the end of the game. In some variations of the game, game play continues until only one person still has cards in hand.

Game scoring can involve penalty points, like Big Two, or positive points. In versions of the game where game play ends when a person wins, the winner is awarded one point and the losers no points. In versions of the game where gameplay continues until one person has cards in hand, the winner is awarded five points, the second-place finisher is awarded three points, and the third-place finisher is awarded one point.

Variations
In the Southwest of England, this is known as Frazz's game, the suits are ranked Diamonds, Clubs, Hearts, Spades and instead of using a points system the losing player becomes the dealer. The four of a kind hand cannot be made into a 5 card hand.

See also
Big Two
Pai gow

References

Shedding-type card games
Rummy
Comparing card games
Gambling games
Games of mental skill
Multiplayer games
Poker variants
Climbing games